The trimethylbenzenes constitute a group of substances of aromatic hydrocarbons, which structure consists of a benzene ring with three methyl groups (–CH3) as a substituent. Through their different arrangement, they form three structural isomers with the molecular formula C9H12. They also belong to the group of C3-benzenes. The best-known isomer is mesitylene.

{| class="wikitable" style="text-align:center; font-size:90%"
|-
| class="hintergrundfarbe6" colspan="4" | Trimethylbenzenes
|-
| class="hintergrundfarbe5" align="left" | Common name
| hemimellitene || pseudocumene || mesitylene
|-
| class="hintergrundfarbe5" align="left" | Systematic names
| 1,2,3-trimethylbenzenevic.-trimethylbenzene || 1,2,4-trimethylbenzeneasym.-trimethylbenzene || 1,3,5-trimethylbenzenesym.-trimethylbenzene
|-
| class="hintergrundfarbe5" align="left" | Structural formula
|  ||  || 
|-
| class="hintergrundfarbe5" align="left" | CAS Registry Number
| 526-73-8 || 95-63-6 || 108-67-8
|}

References

Alkylbenzenes
C3-Benzenes